Kerstin Alm (born 9 May 1949) is a politician of the autonomous Åland Islands. She served as Minister of Industry and Trade from 2003 to 2005.

See also
Government of Åland

References

External links
 Nordic Council entry, norden.com 

1949 births
Living people
Women government ministers of Åland
21st-century Finnish women politicians
Place of birth missing (living people)